The following highways are numbered 87:

International
 Asian Highway 87
 European route E87

Australia
  Stuart Highway (A87, or Highway A87)
 Kidman Way (New South Wales)
 Surat Developmental Road (Queensland)

Greece
Greek National Road 87

India
 National Highway 87 (India)
State Highway 87 (Karnataka)

Iran

Ireland
 N87 road (Ireland)

Israel
Highway 87 (Israel)

Korea, South
 National Route 87

New Zealand
  New Zealand State Highway 87

United States
 Interstate 87 (New York)
 Interstate 87 (North Carolina)
 U.S. Route 87
 Alabama State Route 87
 Arizona State Route 87
 Arkansas Highway 87
 California State Route 87
 Connecticut Route 87
 Florida State Road 87
 County Road 87A (Santa Rosa County, Florida)
 Georgia State Route 87
 Idaho State Highway 87
 Illinois Route 87 (former)
 K-87 (Kansas highway)
 Kentucky Route 87
 Louisiana Highway 87
 Maryland Route 87 (former)
 M-87 (Michigan highway) (former)
 Minnesota State Highway 87
 Missouri Route 87
 Montana Highway 87
 Nebraska Highway 87
 New Hampshire Route 87
 New Jersey Route 87
 County Route 87 (Bergen County, New Jersey)
 New York State Route 87 (former)
 County Route 87 (Chautauqua County, New York)
 County Route 87 (Dutchess County, New York)
 County Route 87 (Erie County, New York)
 County Route 87 (Jefferson County, New York)
 County Route 87 (Monroe County, New York)
 County Route 87 (Orleans County, New York)
 County Route 87 (Steuben County, New York)
 County Route 87 (Suffolk County, New York)
 County Route 87 (Westchester County, New York)
 North Carolina Highway 87
 Ohio State Route 87
 Oklahoma State Highway 87
 Pennsylvania Route 87
 South Dakota Highway 87
 Tennessee State Route 87
 Texas State Highway 87
 Texas State Highway Spur 87
 Farm to Market Road 87
 Ranch to Market Road 87 (former)
 Utah State Route 87
 Virginia State Route 87
 West Virginia Route 87
 Wisconsin Highway 87
 Wyoming Highway 87

See also
A87